William Hodgson may refer to:

 William Hodgson (Master of Peterhouse, Cambridge) (died 1847), British academic
 William Hodgson (Australian politician) (1814–1891), Tasmanian politician
 William Hodgson (Canadian politician) (1912–1988)
 William Ballantyne Hodgson (1815–1880), Scottish educational reformer and political economist
 William Hope Hodgson (1877–1918), English fantasy author
 William Nicholson Hodgson, British Member of the UK Parliament for Carlisle
 W. N. Hodgson (William Noel Hodgson, 1893–1916), English war poet
 Billy Hodgson (born 1935), Scottish footballer
 William R. Hodgson (died 1998), Canadian hotel magnate and Toronto Argonauts owner
 William Roy Hodgson (1892–1958), Australian public servant and diplomat
 Bill Hodgson (curler) (1944–2022), Canadian curler